The British Horse Industry Confederation is a representative umbrella organisation for both professional and amateur involvement in equestrian activities in Great Britain.  The organisation is formed of the British Equestrian Federation, the Thoroughbred Breeders Association and the British Horseracing Authority. It also has representation from the British Horse Society and British Equestrian Trade Association (both members of the BEF) and from the British Equine Veterinary Association.

Activities
The organisation represents the interests of the equestrian industry in dealings and reports with government.

In 2005, the BHIC published the first national strategy for the horse industry in England and Wales, in partnership with the government departments from Defra and the Department for Culture, Media and Sport.

References

External links
British Horse Industry Confederation Official Website

Equestrian organizations
Business organisations based in the United Kingdom
Horses in the United Kingdom